Bridgerton is a period drama television series created by Chris Van Dusen and produced by Shondaland for Netflix. It is based on the Regency romance literary series by Julia Quinn set in London's ton during the season, when debutantes are presented at court.

Cast
  = Main cast (credited) 
  = Recurring cast (3+)
  = Guest cast (1-2)

Main cast

Recurring cast

Bridgerton family
The Bridgertons are a tight-knit and well respected family in the ton composed of the widow and eight children of the late Edmund, 8th Viscount Bridgerton. They live between Bridgerton House in Mayfair and their country home Aubrey Hall in Kent.

 Anthony, 9th Viscount Bridgerton (played by Jonathan Bailey) is the eldest Bridgerton child and the head of the family. He became Viscount at a young age after witnessing the sudden death of his father, which left him traumatised, closed-off, and fearful of love and loss. Anthony is the lead character of the second novel, The Viscount Who Loved Me, and of the second season of the series.
 Benedict Bridgerton (played by Luke Thompson) is the second eldest Bridgerton child. As the "spare" of the family, he is less concerned with conforming to society and discovers a passion for art and a more bohemian lifestyle. Benedict is the lead character of the third novel, An Offer from a Gentleman.
 Colin Bridgerton (played by Luke Newton) is the third Bridgerton child. He struggles with a lack of purpose and spends much of his time travelling. Colin is the lead character of the fourth novel, Romancing Mister Bridgerton.
 Daphne Basset (née Bridgerton), Duchess of Hastings (played by Phoebe Dynevor) is the fourth Bridgerton child and eldest daughter of the family. In the books, she is in her second season and lacks worthy suitors because most men consider her "too friendly"; in the series, she is the season's "Incomparable" and a highly sought after debutante, whose chances at a match are repeatedly sabotaged by her overprotective brother Anthony. Daphne is the lead character of the first novel, The Duke and I, and of the first season of the series.

 Eloise Bridgerton (played by Claudia Jessie) is the fifth Bridgerton child. She is frustrated by her limited options as a woman and would rather educate herself than engage with the season or settle down. Eloise is the lead character of the fifth novel, To Sir Phillip with Love.
 Francesca Bridgerton (played by Ruby Stokes in seasons 1–2, and Hannah Dodd in season 3–) is the sixth Bridgerton child. She is more reserved than the rest of her family and is often away. Francesca is the lead character of the sixth novel, When He Was Wicked.
 Gregory Bridgerton (played by Will Tilston) is the seventh Bridgerton child and youngest son of the family. Gregory is the lead character of the eighth and final novel, On the Way to the Wedding. 
 Hyacinth Bridgerton (played by Florence Hunt) is the eighth and youngest Bridgerton child. Despite her young age, she often tries to involve herself in the exploits of her older siblings. Hyacinth is the lead character of the seventh novel, It's In His Kiss. 
 Violet (née Ledger), Dowager Viscountess Bridgerton (played by Ruth Gemmell in Bridgerton, and Connie Jenkins-Greig in the prequel) is the mother to the Bridgerton children and Edmund's widow. She had a poor reaction to her husband's premature death and became emotionally absent, but has since transformed into a loving and protective matriarch for her family, though she occasionally lacks awareness of her children's deeper anxieties.
 Edmund, 8th Viscount Bridgerton† (played by Rupert Evans in a flashback) was the father of the Bridgerton children and Violet's husband. He unexpectedly died in 1803 from an allergic reaction to a bee sting.

Love interests
 Simon Basset, Duke of Hastings (played by Regé-Jean Page) is an eligible suitor who returns to London during the season, having sworn against marriage and children due to a vow he made to his abusive father on the latter's deathbed. He makes a pact with Daphne Bridgerton to feign a courtship to serve both their interests, leading to a growing attraction between them. In the books, he becomes a supporting character after the first novel; however, Page exited the series after the first season with Simon occasionally mentioned in passing.
 Kathani "Kate" (née Sharma), Viscountess Bridgerton (played by Simone Ashley) is, in the series, a newcomer to the ton from India and a designated "spinster" at the age of 26; in the books, the character's name is Katharine Grace Sheffield and she is the daughter of a baron's younger son from Somerset. While trying to prevent Anthony from courting her younger sister, Edwina, Kate and Anthony are drawn to each other, to the initial horror of both. In the series, similarly to Anthony, Kate had to step up to raise her sister after their father's death and carries the burden of responsibility in her family.

 Penelope Featherington (played by Nicola Coughlan) is a friend of Eloise Bridgerton who lives in the house across the road. In the series, she is the youngest Featherington daughter; in the books, there is a fourth daughter, Felicity. A seemingly naïve wallflower, Pen is revealed to be the anonymous gossip columnist Lady Whistledown (narrated by Julie Andrews in a voiceover role) at the end of the first season, something not revealed by the books until the fourth novel. She has harboured a secret infatuation with Colin for many years.
 Sir Phillip Crane (played by Chris Fulton) is a baronet and the younger brother of Marina Thompson's lover, George. After George dies in battle, he marries Marina to care for her and her children. He has a keen interest in botany.

Family members
 Portia, Dowager Baroness Featherington (played by Polly Walker) is the matriarch of the Featherington family, known for her tacky fashion sense and various schemes to marry off her daughters.
 Prudence Featherington (played by Bessie Carter and Philippa Finch (née Featherington) (played by Harriet Cains) are the older Featherington daughters. Philippa marries Albion Finch◊ (played by Lorn Macdonald) in the series' second season. In the books, Philippa marries Nigel Berbrooke, while Prudence marries Robert Huxley.
 Marina, Lady Crane (née Thompson) (played by Ruby Barker) is, in the series, a Featherington cousin from a rural gentry family. Her lover George Crane left her pregnant when he went off to war, and died before he could fulfil his intention to marry her. She tries to marry Colin to ensure her child's wellbeing, but Lady Whistledown exposes her motives. She later accepts the proposal of George's brother Sir Phillip and gives birth to twins Oliver and Amanda. In the books, Marina is a Bridgerton cousin who dies of pneumonia before the events of To Sir Phillip with Love.
 Archibald, Baron Featherington† (played by Ben Miller) is the head of the Featherington family and a known gambler. Already deceased in the books, he appears in the first season of the series.
 Lord Jack Featherington◊ (played by Rupert Young) is a cousin of Archibald and the presumed heir to the Featherington estate upon the latter's death. He is a fraudster who claims to own ruby mines, which are later revealed to be unprofitable.
 Edwina Sharma (played by Charithra Chandran) (Sheffield in the books) is Mary's daughter and Kate's younger half-sister, a "diamond of the season" who wishes for a love match. She has many suitors but chooses to court Anthony, to the displeasure of Kate.

 Lady Mary Sharma (played by Shelley Conn) (Sheffield in the books) is Edwina's mother and Kate's stepmother. In the series, she refused a more eligible suitor in order to marry Kate's father, a secretary from India.
 Lord and Lady Sheffield (played by Anthony Head and Shobu Kapoor) are Mary's parents and Edwina's grandparents in the series. In the books, Kate and Edwina's father is surnamed Sheffield, and Mary is a Sheffield by marriage.
 The Duke† and Duchess of Hastings† (played by Richard Pepple and Daphne di Cinto in flashbacks) are Simon's parents. In the series, the Duchess's name is Sarah Basset. Simon's mother died in childbirth, and his father put a great deal of pressure on his son and shamed him for having a stutter in his youth.

Royalty
The royals are only in the background of the books. Queen Charlotte was expanded upon in Bridgerton, becoming the subject of the prequel Queen Charlotte: A Bridgerton Story and its novelisation penned by Shonda Rhimes and Julia Quinn. Although they are based on real-life historical figures, the depiction of royal characters in the two series is largely fictional and has no basis in history.
 Queen Charlotte (played by Golda Rosheuvel in Bridgerton, and India Amarteifio in the prequel) is based on the real life queen consort Charlotte of Mecklenburg-Strelitz. She greets the debutantes at the start of each season and is determined to discover who is behind Lady Whistledown.
 Prince Friedrich of Prussia (played by Freddie Stroma) is Queen Charlotte's nephew who courts Daphne in the first season of the series.
 King George III (played by James Fleet in Bridgerton, and Corey Mylchreest in the prequel) is based on the real king. As in real life, he has gone mad by the time of Bridgerton.

Members of the ton

 Lady Danbury (played by Adjoa Andoh in Bridgerton, and Arsema Thomas in the prequel) is an insightful doyenne and powerful matron of the ton. She mentored Simon growing up.
 Lady Cowper and Cressida Cowper (played by Joanna Babin and Jessica Madsen) are a gossipy mother and daughter.
 Nigel, Baron Berbrooke (played by Jamie Beamish) courts Daphne in the first book and first season. Caroline Quentin plays his mother, Lady Berbrooke◊.
 Sir Henry Granville◊ (played by Julian Ovenden) is an artist who introduces Benedict to the bohemian underworld in the first season of the series. He is gay, in a open marriage with his wife Lucy◊ (played by Sandra Teles) and secret relationship with Lord Wetherby◊ (played by Ned Porteous).
 Thomas Dorset◊ (played by Sam Frenchum) went to Oxford with Anthony, who enlists Dorset to distract Kate from Edwina. He later shows interest in her, making Anthony jealous.
 Other members of the ton include Kitty Langham◊ (played by Céline Buckens), Lady Trowbridge◊ (played by Amy Beth Hayes), Lord Fife◊ (played by Bert Seymour) and Lord Cho◊ (played by Caleb Obediah).

Working class

 Will Mondrich◊ (played by Martins Imhangbe) is a boxer and Simon Basset's friend. He is based on and his name is a spoonerism of the real life boxer from the time Bill Richmond. He retires from boxing and later starts his own gentleman's club with his wife, Alice◊ (played by Emma Naomi).
 Siena Rosso (played by Sabrina Bartlett) is an opera singer and Anthony's mistress in the first season. Their tumultuous relationship comes to an end before he meets Kate and Edwina. In the book, her name is Maria Rosso and her relationship with Anthony had already ended by the start of The Viscount Who Loved Me.
 Genevieve Delacroix◊ (played by Kathryn Drysdale) is the mysterious local modiste who fakes being French and makes dresses for the ladies of the ton. She has an affair with Benedict in the first season. In the second, she becomes an accomplice to Penelope.
 In season 2, Benedict has an affair with model Tessa◊ (played by Emily Barber).
 Theo Sharpe◊ (played by Calam Lynch) works at the print shop. Eloise meets him in season 2 while she investigates Lady Whistledown, and he introduces her to feminist texts and organising.

Servantry
 Brimsley◊ (played by Hugh Sachs in Bridgerton, and Sam Clemmett in the prequel) is the Queen's secretary.
 Rose Nolan◊ (played by Molly McGlynn) is Daphne's maid and confidant.
 Jeffries (played by Jason Barnett) is the Bassets' butler.
 Mrs Varley◊ (played by Lorraine Ashbourne) is the Featheringtons' housekeeper.
 Mrs Wilson◊ (played by Geraldine Alexander) is the Bridgertons' housekeeper.
 Humboldt (played by Simon Ludders) is the Bridgertons' butler.
 John◊ (played by Oli Higginson) is a Bridgerton footman who is friends with Eloise.

Notes
 † – Character is deceased.
 ◊ – Series-only character.

References

Characters
Bridgerton
Bridgerton